This is a list of films set on or around the New Year of the Gregorian calendar.

Action
 Assault on Precinct 13 (2005)
 Friday Foster (1975)

Comedy

 Are We There Yet? (2005)
 Bachelor Mother (1939)
 Bloodhounds of Broadway (1989)
 Carnival Night (1956)
 Down and Out in Beverly Hills (1986)
 Every Day's a Holiday (1937)
 Four Rooms (1995)
 Get Crazy (1983)
 Ghostbusters II (1989)
 The Gold Rush (1925) 
 The Hudsucker Proxy (1994) 
 The Passionate Thief (1960)
 It Happened on Fifth Avenue (1947)
 Junior Miss (1945)
 My Big Night (2015)
 New Year's Day (2001)
 Operation Happy New Year (1996)
 Operation Petticoat (1959)
 Party Party (1983)
 Radio Days (1987)
 Trading Places (1983)

Comedy-drama

 200 Cigarettes (1999)
 Bridge and Tunnel (2014)
 Diner (1982)
 For Keeps (1988)
 Forrest Gump (1994)
 Highball (1997)
 Ladies in Black (2018)
 A Long Way Down (2014)
 Mermaids (1990)
 Metropolitan (1990)
 More American Graffiti (1979) 
 New Year's Day (1989)
 Peter's Friends (1992)
 Starter for 10 (2006)
 Surviving New Year's (2008)
 Sweet Hearts Dance (1988)

Crime/caper/heist

 After the Thin Man (1936)
 Better Luck Tomorrow (2002)
 La bonne année (1973)
 Dick Tracy (1990)
 Dhoom (2004)
 Entrapment (1999)
 The Godfather Part II (1974)
 Happy New Year (1987)
 Little Caesar (1931)
 Money Train (1995)
 Ocean's 11 (1960)
 Poor Sasha (1997)

Disaster
 Beyond the Poseidon Adventure (1979)
 Ground Control (1998)
 Poseidon (2006)
 The Poseidon Adventure (1972)
 The Poseidon Adventure (2005)

Drama

 54 (1998)
 Boogie Nights (1997)
 Carol (2015)
 Cavalcade (1933)
 The Divorcee (1930)
 Fruitvale Station (2013)
 Home Before Dark (1958)
 I'll Be Seeing You (1944)
 I Never Promised You a Rose Garden (1977)
 Looking for Mr. Goodbar (1977)
 Middle of the Night (1959)
 My Reputation (1946)
 The New Year (2010)
 New Year's Eve (1929)
 One Way Passage (1932)
 The Passionate Friends (1949)
 Penny Serenade (1941)
 Phantom Thread (2017)
 Pollock (2000)
 Il Posto (1961)
 Splendor in the Grass (1961)
 The Stud (1978)
 'Til We Meet Again (1940)
 Two Lovers (2008)
 Ulysses' Gaze (1995)
 Yanks (1979)

Film noir
 Backfire (1950)
 Repeat Performance (1947)
 Sunset Boulevard (1950)
 Walk Softly, Stranger (1950)

Horror

 Angel Heart (1987)
 Antisocial (2013)
 Bloody New Year (1987)
 The Children (2008)
 Day Watch (2006)
 End of Days (1999)
 Ghostkeeper (1981)
 Holidays (2016)
 Iced (1988)
 The Mephisto Waltz (1971)
 Mystery of the Wax Museum (1933)
 New Year's Evil (1980)
 The Phantom Carriage (1921)
 The Phantom Carriage (1958)
 Rosemary's Baby (1968)
 The Shining (1980)
 Terror Train (1980)

Musical
 An American in Paris (1951)
 Bundle of Joy (1956)
 Carnival Night (1956)
 Get Crazy (1983)
 Holiday Inn (1942)
 New Year Adventures of Masha and Vitya (1975)
 Rent (2005)

Romance/romantic comedy

 About a Boy (2002)
 An Affair to Remember (1957)
 And So They Were Married (1936)
 The Apartment (1960)
 Baby Cakes (1989)
 Bachelor Mother (1939)
 Bridget Jones's Diary (2001)
 Café Society (2016)
 Can't Buy Me Love (1987)
 Come Look at Me (2001)
 Desk Set (1957)
 Holiday (1938)
 The Holiday (2006)
 Holiday Affair (1949)
 In Search of a Midnight Kiss (2008)
 The Irony of Fate (1976)
 The Irony of Fate 2 (2007)
 It's Love I'm After (1937)
 Made for Each Other (1939)
 The Moon's Our Home (1936)
 New Year's Eve (2011)
 Remember the Night (1940)
 The Rose Bowl Story (1952)
 Sex and the City: The Movie (2008)
 Sleepless in Seattle (1993)
 Someone Like You (2001)
 Untamed Heart (1993)
 When Harry Met Sally... (1989)
 While You Were Sleeping (1995)
 Yolki (2010)
 Yolki 2 (2011)
 Yolki 3 (2013)
 Yolki 1914 (2014)
 Yolki 5 (2016)

Science fiction
 Alien Nation: Millennium (1996)
 Black Lightning (2009)
 Doctor Who (1996)
 Snowpiercer (2013)
 Strange Days (1995)
 The Time Machine (1960)
 The End of Evangelion (1997)

Thriller
 Bitter Moon (1992)
 Night Train to Paris (1964)
 Survivor (2015)
 Taboo (2002)
 Under Suspicion (2000)

Compilations
 Cinematic Depictions of New Year’s Eve (1921-2015) An edited montage of the New Year scenes of many of these films.

See also
 New Year's Eve
 New Year's Day

Lists of films set around holidays